Milada Paulová (2 November 1891 - 17 January 1970) was a Czech historian and Byzantologist, and the first female professor at Charles University, Prague.

Life and career
Paulová was born in Loukov in Bohemia. Her mother died when she was three years old, and her father was the director of a sugarcane factory. When the factory went bankrupt, the family moved to Prague, where she completed her education at the teachers' school for girls. As the leaving exam for this school was not recognized by the university, she studied independently to take the final exam for Prague Grammar School, which she passed.

She studied History and Geography at the Faculty of Arts at Charles University, graduating in 1918 with a doctorate in Philosophy. She was the second woman to receive this degree, after Alice Masaryková. After graduating, she worked at the faculty as an academic assistant, and in this role she travelled to Yugoslavia to collect documentation regarding the role of Yugoslav and Czech émigrés in World War I.

In 1925, Paulová was made Assistant Professor of History of Eastern Europe and the Balkans, the first woman in Czechoslovakia to achieve this title. She was appointed Special Professor in 1934 and Regular Professor in 1945.

Paulová spent much of her time on research trips to Yugoslavia, France and the United Kingdom. She was the author of several books on the history of Yugoslavia, the Czechoslovak-Yugoslavian relations, and Byzantium.

The Milada Paulová Award is given out by the Czech Ministry of Education, Youth and Sports in recognition of the lifelong achievements of women researchers in the Czech Republic.

References

1891 births
1970 deaths
Czech women historians
Charles University alumni
Academic staff of Charles University
20th-century Czech historians